David Douline (born 28 May 1993) is a French professional footballer who plays as a midfielder for Swiss club Servette.

Professional career
Douline is a youth academy product of AS Saint-Étienne. He signed for Clermont Foot in the summer of 2017 after a successful seasons in the lower divisions of France. He was set to be loaned to Rodez AF, but the deal fell through after administrative errors by Clermont. Douline made his professional debut for Clermont Foot in a Ligue 2 2–0 win over LB Châteauroux on 19 September 2017.

Douline joined Rodez AF on loan for the 2018–19 season.

On 22 June 2021, he joined Servette in Switzerland on a two-year contract.

References

External links
 
 
 

1993 births
Living people
Sportspeople from Grenoble
Footballers from Auvergne-Rhône-Alpes
Association football midfielders
French footballers
Thonon Evian Grand Genève F.C. players
Clermont Foot players
Rodez AF players
Servette FC players
Ligue 2 players
Championnat National players
Championnat National 2 players
Championnat National 3 players
Swiss Super League players
French expatriate footballers
Expatriate footballers in Switzerland
French expatriate sportspeople in Switzerland